A paper route or newspaper route is the subscription list of a paperboy typically following a fixed route every day.

Paper Route may also refer to:

 Paper Route (band), an indie band from Nashville, Tennessee
 "Paper Route", a 2019 song by Hooligan Hefs
 The Paper Route, a 2000 album by rapper Mack 10

See also
 Paper Route Frank, a forthcoming posthumous 2022 album by Young Dolph